The Darjah Jasa Bakti Sarawak (Order of Meritorious Service to Sarawak) is the third-ranking order in the list of orders of the Sarawak State Orders, Decorations and Medals.  The Order was instituted in 1997, and is limited to only 100 living recipients at one time. This order may be awarded to any civil servants or officers of statutory bodies that discharged their duties honourably and rendered excellent service to the State of Sarawak.

The Order consists of a Breast Star, a Sash, a Sash Badge, and a Miniature Medal.

The recipients of the order will receive the title Datu (for both male & female recipients) while the wives are styled Datin. Husbands of recipients do not enjoy a courtesy title.

Recipients 
Recipients of the Darjah Jasa Bakti Sarawak include:-
 Datu Mohamed Khalid Yusuf, State Director, Royal Customs Department - 2004
 Datu Vasco Sabat Singkang, General Manager, Sarawak Land Consolidation and Rehabilitation Authority (SALCRA) - 2004
 Datu Dr Adi Badiozaman Tuah alias Badio Zaman Tuah, State Education Director - 2004
 Datu Haji Loling Othman bin Haji Alwi, State Mufti - 2004
 Datu Haji Mohammed Sepuan Anu, State Director of Agriculture - 2004
 Datu Sarudu Hoklai, Director, Human Resource Development Unit, Chief Minister's Department - 2009
 Datu Romie Sigan Daniel, Resident, Betong Division - 2009
 Datu Masbah Ariffin, Clerk, Sarawak State Cabinet - 2009
 Datu Abu Bakar Mat, Director, Sarawak National Registration Department - 2009
 Datu Mohidin Ishak, General Manager, Bintulu Development Authority - 2009
 Datu Dr Julaihi Bujang, State Education Director - 2009
 Datu Takun Sunggah, State Director, Elections Commission - 2009
 Datu Chaiti Bolhassan, Permanent Secretary, Ministry of Rural Development Sarawak - 2010
 Datu Dr Ngenang Janggu, Permanent Secretary, Ministry of Agriculture Modernisation Sarawak - 2010
 Datu Ik Pahon Joyik, Permanent Secretary, Ministry of Tourism and Heritage Sarawak - 2010
 Datu Junaidi Reduan, State Financial Secretary - 2010
 Datu Mustapa Han, Private Secretary to the Chief Minister of Sarawak - 2010
 Datu Dr Sulaiman Husain, General Manager, Sarawak Economic Development Corporation (SEDC) - 2010
 Datu Dr Andrew Kiyu Dawie, former State Director of Health - 2010
 Datu Lai Kui Fong, Director of Agriculture Sarawak - 2014
 Datu Jumastapha Lamat, State Accountant General - 2014
 Datu Thomas Akin Jelimin, Judge, Bumiputera Court of Sarawak -2014
 Datu Safri Zainuddin, Permanent Secretary, Sarawak Ministry of Infrastructure Development and Transportation - 2017
 Datu Ir Zuraimi Sabki, Director, Sarawak Public Works Department - 2017
 Datu William Patrick Nyigor, State Human Resource Director - 2017
 Datu Micheal Dawi Alli, Chief Registrar, Bumiputera Court of Sarawak - 2017
Datu Sutin Shamat, Secretary of the State Cabinet Meeting Committee - 2018
Datu Wan Lizosman Wan Omar Sutin Shamat, Permanent Secretary, Sarawak Ministry of Urban Development and Natural Resources - 2018
Datu Soedirman Aini, General Manager, Sarawak Economic Development Corporation (SEDC) - 2018
Datu Sharbini Suhaili, CEO, Sarawak Energy Berhad (SEB) - 2018
Prof Datu Mohd Fadzil Abdul Rahman, Deputy Vice Chancellor, Universiti Malaysia Sarawak - 2018
Datu Ken Leben, Director, Sarawak Immigration Department - 2018

References

External links
 Photo of Darjah Jasa Bakti Sarawak

Meritorious Service to Sarawak